MacTeX is a free redistribution of TeX Live, a typesetting environment based on TeX. While TeX Live is designed to be cross-platform (running on Unix, MacOS, and Windows), MacTeX includes Mac-specific utilities and front-ends (such as TeXShop and BibDesk). It is also pre-configured to work out-of-the-box with macOS, as it provides sensible defaults for configuration options that, in TeX Live, are left up to the user to allow for its cross-platform compatibility.

Details
MacTeX is packaged and distributed by the MacTeX TeXnical working group, a subgroup of TeX Users Group (TUG). TeX Live is distributed by the TUG, making MacTeX less a fork of TeX Live than a customised repackaging.

The full MacTeX install package contains three subpackages:

 TeX Live
 GUI-Applications
BibDesk
 Excalibur (a LaTeX spell checker)
 LaTeXiT (a LaTeX equation editor)
 TeX Live Utility (a utility to update, install or remove parts of TeX Live)
 TeXShop (A Mac-based TeX editor)
 Ghostscript (an open source version of PostScript)

A substantially smaller version of MacTeX, BasicTeX, which does not contain Ghostscript or the aforementioned GUI programs, can be used instead along with a TeX editor as well.

See also 

 BibDesk
 MiKTeX
 TeX Live
 TeXShop

References

External links
 

Free TeX software
TeX software for macOS